Massachusetts House of Representatives' 12th Worcester district in the United States is one of 160 legislative districts included in the lower house of the Massachusetts General Court. It covers part of Worcester County. Democrat Meghan Kilcoyne has represented the district since 2021. Candidates for this district seat in the 2020 primary included Ceylan Rowe and Meghan Kilcoyne. Candidates Meghan Kilcoyne, Susan Smiley, and Charlene DiCalogero have been selected to run in the general election in November 2020.

Towns represented
The district includes the following localities:
 Berlin
 Boylston
 Clinton
 Lancaster
 part of Northborough
 part of Sterling

The current district geographic boundary overlaps with those of the Massachusetts Senate's 1st Worcester district and Worcester and Middlesex district.

Former locales
The district previously covered:
 Grafton, circa 1872 
 Shrewsbury, circa 1872

Representatives
 Amasa Walker, circa 1858 
 Luther Stowell, circa 1859 
 Albert L. Fisher, circa 1888 
 J. Henry Robinson, circa 1888 
 Henry H. Wheelock, circa 1920 
 Arthur Ulton Mahan, circa 1951 
 Thomas Francis Fallon, circa 1975 
 William Constantino Jr.
 Harold P. Naughton, Jr., 1995-2021
 Meghan Kilcoyne, 2021-current

See also
 List of Massachusetts House of Representatives elections
 Other Worcester County districts of the Massachusetts House of Representatives: 1st, 2nd, 3rd, 4th, 5th, 6th, 7th, 8th, 9th, 10th, 11th, 13th, 14th, 15th, 16th, 17th, 18th
 Worcester County districts of the Massachusett Senate: 1st, 2nd; Hampshire, Franklin and Worcester; Middlesex and Worcester; Worcester, Hampden, Hampshire and Middlesex; Worcester and Middlesex; Worcester and Norfolk
 List of Massachusetts General Courts
 List of former districts of the Massachusetts House of Representatives

Images
Portraits of legislators

References

Further reading

External links
 Ballotpedia
  (State House district information based on U.S. Census Bureau's American Community Survey).

House
Government in Worcester County, Massachusetts